The Robert Award for Best Score (previously called Robert Prisen for årets musik, Lit.:The Robert Award for music of the year) is one of the merit awards presented by the Danish Film Academy at the annual Robert Awards ceremony. The award has been handed out every year since 1984, except 1988.

Honorees

1980s 
 1984: Leif Sylvester Petersen for 
 1985: Kim Larsen for In the Middle of the Night
 1986:  - 
 1987: Anne Linnet for Early Spring
 1988: Not awarded
 1989: Jacob Groth for

1990s 
 1990: Thomas Koppel for 
 1991: Fini Høstrup for 
 1992:  - Europa
 1993: Joachim Holbek and Billy Cross for 
 1994: Anders Koppel and  - Jungledyret Hugo
 1995: Joachim Holbek for Riget
 1996: Anders Koppel for 
 1997:  - The Biggest Heroes
 1999: Joakim Holbek for Heart of Light

2000s 
 2001: Björk and Mark Bell for Dancer in the Dark
 2002: Tim Stahl and John Guldberg (Laid Back) for 
 2003: Halfdan E for Okay
 2004: Halfdan E for The Inheritance
 2005:  - Terkel in Trouble
 2006: Halfdan E for Manslaughter
 2007:  and Mikael Simpson for 
 2008: Karsten Fundal for The Art of Crying
 2009:  for The Candidate

2010s 
 2010: Tina Dickow for Oldboys
 2011: Thomas Blachman and Kristian Eidnes Andersen for Submarino
 2012: Sune Martin for Dirch
 2014: Cliff Martinez for Only God Forgives
 2015: Tina Dickow and  - En du elsker

References

External links 
  

1984 establishments in Denmark
Awards established in 1984
Film awards for best score
Score